The following outline is provided as an overview of and topical guide to dance:

Dance – human movement either used as a form of expression or presented in a social, spiritual or performance setting. Choreography is the art of making dances, and the person who does this is called a choreographer. Definitions of what constitutes dance are dependent on social, cultural, aesthetic, artistic and moral constraints and range from functional movement (such as Folk dance) to codified, virtuoso techniques such as ballet. A great many dances and dance styles are performed to dance music.

What type of thing is dance?
Dance (also called "dancing") can fit the following categories:

 an activity or behavior
 one of the arts – a creative endeavor or discipline.
 one of the performing arts.
 Hobby – regular activity or interest that is undertaken for pleasure, typically done during one's leisure time.
 Exercise – bodily activity that enhances or maintains physical fitness and overall health and wellness.
Sport—bodily activity that displays physical exertion
Recreation – leisure time activity
Ritual

Some other things can be named "dance" metaphorically; see dance (disambiguation)

Types of dance 

Type of dance – a particular dance or dance style.  There are many varieties of dance.  Dance categories are not mutually exclusive. For example, tango is traditionally a partner dance. While it is mostly social dance, its ballroom form may be competitive dance, as in DanceSport. At the same time it is enjoyed as performance dance, whereby it may well be a solo dance.
 List of dances
 List of dance style categories
 List of ethnic, regional, and folk dances by origin
 List of folk dances sorted by origin
 List of national dances
 List of DanceSport dances

Dance genres 

 Acro dance
 B-boying
 Ballet
 Bollywood dance
 Ballroom dance
 Baroque dance
 Belly dance
 Glossary of belly dance terms
Bharatanatyam
Casino (Cuban salsa)
Cha-cha-cha
 Chicago stepping
 Circle dance
 Competitive dance
 Dance squad
 Contemporary dance
 Contra dance
 Country-western dance
 Disco
 Hustle
 Erotic dancing
 Fandango
 Flamenco
 Folk dance
 Hip-hop dance
 Indian classical dance
 Jazz dance
 Jig
 Jive
 Krumping
 Lambada
 Lap dance
 Limbo
 Line dance
 Mambo
 Modern dance
 Pole dance
 Polka
 Quickstep
 Salsa
 Sequence dance
 Street dance
 Swing
 Tango
 Tap dance
 Twist
 Two-step
 Waltz
 War dance
 Zamba

Dance styles by number of interacting dancers 
 Solo dance – a dance danced by an individual dancing alone.
 Partner dance – dance with just 2 dancers, dancing together. In most partner dances, one, typically a man, is the leader; the other, typically a woman, is the follower. As a rule, they maintain connection with each other. In some dances the connection is loose and called dance handhold. In other dances the connection involves body contact.
 Glossary of partner dance terms
 Group dance – dance danced by a group of people simultaneously. Group dances are generally, but not always, coordinated or standardized in such a way that all the individuals in the group are dancing the same steps at the same time. Alternatively, various groups within the larger group may be dancing different, but complementary, parts of the larger dance.

Dance styles by main purpose 
 Ceremonial dance – 
 Competitive dance – 
 Erotic dance – 
 Participation dance – 
 Performance dance – 
 Social dance – 
 Concert dance –

Geography of dance (by region) 
 Africa

 West Africa 

 Benin • Burkina Faso • Cape Verde • Côte d'Ivoire • Gambia • Ghana • Guinea • Guinea-Bissau • Liberia • Mali • Mauritania • Niger • Nigeria • Senegal • Sierra Leone • Togo

 North Africa 

 Algeria • Egypt (Ancient Egypt) • Libya • Mauritania • Morocco • Sudan • South Sudan •Tunisia • Western Sahara

 Central Africa 

 Angola • Burundi • Cameroon • Central African Republic • Chad • The Democratic Republic of the Congo • Equatorial Guinea • Gabon • Republic of the Congo • Rwanda • São Tomé and Príncipe

 East Africa 

 Burundi • Comoros • Djibouti • Eritrea • Ethiopia • Kenya • Madagascar • Malawi • Mauritius • Mozambique • Rwanda • Seychelles • Somalia • Tanzania • Uganda • Zambia • Zimbabwe

 Southern Africa  

 Botswana • Eswatini • Lesotho • Namibia • South Africa 

 Dependencies
 
 Mayotte (France)  • St. Helena (UK) • Puntland • Somaliland  • Sahrawi Arab Democratic Republic

 Antarctica
 None

 Asia
 Central Asia
 Kazakhstan •  Kyrgyzstan •  Tajikistan •  Turkmenistan •  Uzbekistan
 East Asia
 China 
 Tibet

 Hong Kong •  Macau
 Japan •  North Korea •  South Korea •  Mongolia •  Taiwan  
 North Asia
 Russia
 Southeast Asia
 Brunei •  Burma (Myanmar)  •  Cambodia •  East Timor (Timor-Leste) •  Indonesia •  Laos •  Malaysia •  Philippines •  Singapore •  Thailand •  Vietnam
 South Asia
 Afghanistan •  Bangladesh •  Bhutan • Iran •  Maldives •  Nepal •  Pakistan •  Sri Lanka

 India
 West Asia
  Armenia •  Azerbaijan •  Bahrain •  Cyprus (including disputed Northern Cyprus) •  Georgia •  Iraq •  Israel •  Jordan •  Kuwait •  Lebanon •  Oman •  Palestinian territories Qatar •  Saudi Arabia •  Syria •  Turkey •  United Arab Emirates •  Yemen

 Caucasus (a region considered to be in both Asia and Europe, or between them)

 North Caucasus
 Parts of Russia (Chechnya, Ingushetia, Dagestan, Adyghea, Kabardino-Balkaria, Karachai-Cherkessia, North Ossetia, Krasnodar Krai, Stavropol Krai)

 South Caucasus
 Georgia (including disputed Abkhazia, South Ossetia) • Armenia •   Azerbaijan (including disputed Nagorno-Karabakh Republic)

 Europe 
 Akrotiri and Dhekelia • Åland • Albania • Andorra • Armenia • Austria • Azerbaijan • Belarus • Belgium • Bosnia and Herzegovina • Bulgaria • Croatia • Cyprus • Czech Republic • Denmark • Estonia • Faroe Islands • Finland • France • Georgia • Germany • Gibraltar • Greece • Guernsey • Hungary • Iceland • Ireland • Isle of Man • Italy • Jersey • Kazakhstan • Kosovo • Latvia • Liechtenstein • Lithuania • Luxembourg • Macedonia • Malta • Moldova (including disputed Transnistria) • Monaco • Montenegro • Netherlands • Poland • Portugal • Romania • Russia • San Marino • Serbia • Slovakia • Slovenia •
 Norway
 Svalbard  
Spain
 Autonomous communities of Spain: Catalonia
 Sweden • Switzerland • Turkey • Ukraine 
 United Kingdom
 England • Northern Ireland • Scotland • Wales
 Vatican City

 European Union

 North America
 Canada  
 Provinces of Canada:  • Alberta  • British Columbia • Manitoba  • New Brunswick  • Newfoundland and Labrador  • Nova Scotia  • Ontario (Toronto) • Prince Edward Island  • Quebec • Saskatchewan
 Territories of Canada: Northwest Territories • Nunavut  • Yukon

Greenland • Saint Pierre and Miquelon

 United States 

 Mexico 

 Central America
 Belize • Costa Rica • El Salvador • Guatemala • Honduras • Nicaragua • Panama

 Caribbean
 Anguilla • Antigua and Barbuda •  Aruba •  Bahamas •  Barbados •  Bermuda •  British Virgin Islands •  Cayman Islands •  Cuba •  Dominica •  Dominican Republic •  Grenada •  Haiti •  Jamaica •  Montserrat •  Netherlands Antilles •  Puerto Rico •  Saint Barthélemy •  Saint Kitts and Nevis •  Saint Lucia •  Saint Martin •  Saint Vincent and the Grenadines •  Trinidad and Tobago •  Turks and Caicos Islands •  United States Virgin Islands

Oceania (includes the continent of Australia)
 Australasia
 Australia  
 Dependencies/Territories of Australia
 Christmas Island •  Cocos (Keeling) Islands •   Norfolk Island
 New Zealand  
 Melanesia
 Fiji •  Indonesia (Oceanian part only) •  New Caledonia (France) •  Papua New Guinea •  Rotuma •  Solomon Islands •  Vanuatu  
 Micronesia
 Federated States of Micronesia •  Guam (USA) •  Kiribati •  Marshall Islands •  Nauru •  Northern Mariana Islands (USA) •  Palau •  Wake Island (USA)  
 Polynesia
 American Samoa (USA) •  Chatham Islands (NZ) •  Cook Islands (NZ) •  Easter Island (Chile) •  French Polynesia (France)  •  Hawaii (USA) •  Loyalty Islands (France) • Niue (NZ) •  Pitcairn Islands (UK) •  Adamstown •  Samoa •  Tokelau (NZ) •  Tonga •  Tuvalu •  Wallis and Futuna (France)

 South America 
 Argentina • Bolivia • Brazil • Chile • Colombia • Ecuador • Falkland Islands • Guyana • Paraguay • Peru • Suriname • Uruguay • Venezuela

 South Atlantic

 Ascension Island •  Saint Helena • Tristan da Cunha

History of dance 
History of dance
 Dance in ancient Egypt
 Dance in mythology and religion
 Dance styles throughout history
 Medieval dance
 Masque
 English country dance
 Baroque dance
 Renaissance dance
 Regency dance
 Vintage dance
 Historical dance
 Modern dance
 Contemporary dance

Dance technique 

 Choreography
 Dance notation
 Connection
 Dance moves
 Glossary of dance moves
 Dance partnering
 Dance theory
 Lead and follow
 Musicality

Dance culture 

 Dance and health
 Dance competition
 Dance costume
 Dance critique
 Dance education
 Dance studio
 Dance etiquette
 Dance in film
 Dance double
 Dance film
 Dance marathon
 Dance music
 Dance party
 Ball (dance party)
 Prom
 Rave
 Dance radio
 Dance troupe
 Dance on television
 Nightclub
 Performance
 Performance surface (dance floor)
 Physically integrated dance (disability and dance)
 Women in dance

Dance science 

Dance science
 Dance history – (see History of dance, above)
 Dance and health
 Dance theory
 Dance technology
 Ethnochoreology (dance anthropology)

Dance organizations 

 List of dance organizations

Dance-related media 
 Dance film
 Dance music
 Musical film

Books about dance 
List of dance wikibooks

Dancers 

 List of dancers
 List of dance personalities

See also 
 Index of dance articles
 List of ballroom and social dance albums
 Outline of music
 Music
 Musical terminology
International folk dance
 Quotations about dance

External links

Historic Illustrations of Dancing from 3300 B.C. to 1911 A.D. from Project Gutenberg
United States National Museum of Dance and Hall of Fame

Outlines of culture and arts
Wikipedia outlines